Romanovsky (masculine), Romanovskaya (feminine), or Romanovskoye (neuter) is the name of several rural localities in Russia:
Romanovsky, Kemerovo Oblast, a settlement in Ust-Sosnovskaya Rural Territory of Topkinsky District of Kemerovo Oblast
Romanovsky, Republic of Mordovia, a settlement in Russko-Karayevsky Selsoviet of Temnikovsky District of the Republic of Mordovia
Romanovsky, Orenburg Oblast, a settlement in Romanovsky Selsoviet of Alexandrovsky District of Orenburg Oblast
Romanovsky, Rostov Oblast, a khutor in Donskoye Rural Settlement of Orlovsky District of Rostov Oblast
Romanovsky, Ulyanovsk Oblast, a settlement in Fabrichno-vyselkovsky Rural Okrug of Novospassky District of Ulyanovsk Oblast
Romanovskoye, Kaluga Oblast, a village in Kozelsky District of Kaluga Oblast
Romanovskoye, Kostroma Oblast, a village in Petrovskoye Settlement of Chukhlomsky District of Kostroma Oblast
Romanovskoye, Kurgan Oblast, a selo in Novodostovalovsky Selsoviet of Belozersky District of Kurgan Oblast
Romanovskoye, Moscow Oblast, a village in Bazarovskoye Rural Settlement of Kashirsky District of Moscow Oblast
Romanovskoye, Smolensk Oblast, a village in Slobodskoye Rural Settlement of Monastyrshchinsky District of Smolensk Oblast
Romanovskoye, Tver Oblast, a selo in Romanovskoye Rural Settlement of Vesyegonsky District of Tver Oblast
Romanovskoye, Tyumen Oblast, a selo in Berkutsky Rural Okrug of Yalutorovsky District of Tyumen Oblast
Romanovskoye, Vladimir Oblast, a selo in Alexandrovsky District of Vladimir Oblast
Romanovskaya, Kholmogorsky District, Arkhangelsk Oblast, a village in Ukhtostrovsky Selsoviet of Kholmogorsky District of Arkhangelsk Oblast
Romanovskaya, Shenkursky District, Arkhangelsk Oblast, a village in Nikolsky Selsoviet of Shenkursky District of Arkhangelsk Oblast
Romanovskaya, Ustyansky District, Arkhangelsk Oblast, a village in Minsky Selsoviet of Ustyansky District of Arkhangelsk Oblast
Romanovskaya, Rostov Oblast, a stanitsa in Romanovskoye Rural Settlement of Volgodonskoy District of Rostov Oblast